Øvre Sirdal is a former municipality that was located in the old Vest-Agder county in Norway.  The  municipality existed from 1905 until its dissolution in 1960. It was located in the northern part of the present-day municipality of Sirdal in Agder county. The administrative centre was the village of Lunde where Lunde Church is located.

Name
The name "Øvre Sirdal" means "upper Sirdal" since it was created from the northern part of the old Sirdal municipality. The first element is the genitive case of the name of the river Síra and the last element is dalr which means "valley" or "dale". The meaning of the rivername is unknown (maybe "strong stream").

History
The municipality of Øvre Sirdal was established on 1 January 1905 when the old Sirdal formannskapsdistrikt was split into two municipalities: Øvre Sirdal (population: 753) and Tonstad. During the 1960s, there were many municipal mergers across Norway due to the work of the Schei Committee. On 1 January 1960, Øvre Sirdal (population: 549) was merged with the neighboring municipality of Tonstad (population: 651) and the Øksendal area of the municipality of Bakke (population: 226) to form a new municipality of Sirdal.

Government
All municipalities in Norway, including Øvre Sirdal, are responsible for primary education (through 10th grade), outpatient health services, senior citizen services, unemployment and other social services, zoning, economic development, and municipal roads.  The municipality was governed by a municipal council of elected representatives, which in turn elected a mayor.

Municipal council
The municipal council  of Øvre Sirdal was made up of representatives that were elected to four year terms.  The party breakdown of the final municipal council was as follows:

See also
List of former municipalities of Norway

References

External links

Sirdolen.no 
Weather information for Øvre Sirdal 

Sirdal
Former municipalities of Norway
1905 establishments in Norway
1960 disestablishments in Norway